John Eden may refer to:

John Eden, Baron Eden of Winton (1925–2020), British politician
Sir John Eden, 2nd Baronet (died 1728), Member of Parliament for Durham (UK Parliament constituency)
Sir John Eden, 4th Baronet (1740–1812), Member of Parliament for Durham (UK Parliament constituency)
John R. Eden (1826–1909), U.S. Representative from Illinois
John Eden (athlete) (born 1955), Paralympic athlete from Australia
John Richard Eden (1859–19??), politician in Ontario, Canada
John Eden (producer), a music producer, including for The Catch (album)